In mathematics, the Johnson scheme, named after Selmer M. Johnson, is also known as the triangular association scheme. It consists of the set of all binary vectors X of length ℓ and weight n, such that .  Two vectors x, y ∈ X are called ith associates if dist(x, y) = 2i for i = 0, 1, ..., n. The eigenvalues are given by

 

 

where

 

and Ek(x) is an Eberlein polynomial defined by

References

Combinatorics